The 1937 Northwestern Wildcats team represented Northwestern University during the 1937 Big Ten Conference football season. In their fifth year under head coach Pappy Waldorf, the Wildcats compiled a 4–4 record (3–3 against Big Ten Conference opponents) and finished in a tie for fourth place in the Big Ten Conference.

Schedule

References

Northwestern
Northwestern Wildcats football seasons
Northwestern Wildcats football